Dhalwala is a census town in Tehri Garhwal district  in the state of Uttarakhand, India.

Geography 

Demographics 
 India census, Dhalwala had a population of 11,206. Males constitute 55% of the population and females 45%. Dhalwala has an average literacy rate of 76%, higher than the national average of 59.5%: male literacy is 83% and, female literacy is 67%. In Dhalwala, 14% of the population is under 6 years of age.

References 

Cities and towns in Tehri Garhwal district